The 1939 Westminster Abbey by-election was a parliamentary by-election held on 17 May 1939 for the British House of Commons constituency of Westminster Abbey in London.

Previous MP 
The seat had become vacant when the Conservative Member of Parliament (MP) Sir Sidney Herbert had died on 22 March 1939. Herbert had held the seat since an unopposed 1932 by-election.

Previous Result

Candidates 
The Conservative candidate was Harold Webbe. The Labour candidate in 1935, William Kennedy, had been reselected to contest the next General Election; however, the Labour party decided not to contest the by-election. The Communist party, who had not contested the seat before, chose Dr Billy Carritt. In an attempt to revive the Popular Front strategy, Carritt stood as an Independent Progressive.

Campaign
Carritt's campaign chairman was Liberal MP, Richard Acland. Both the constituency Liberal and Labour parties actively supported his campaign. Those who came to speak for him in the constituency included Liberal MP Wilfrid Roberts, expelled Labour MPs Sir Stafford Cripps and George Strauss and other public figures such as J.B. Priestley.

Result 

Carritt attracted the highest ever percentage poll of any anti-Conservative candidate in this seat. The performance revived interest nationally in electoral co-operation to defeat National Government candidates at a General Election, expected to take place later in the year.

Aftermath 
In the 1945 general election, Carritt stood in Westminster Abbey as a Communist.

Webbe remained its MP until the constituency was abolished for the 1950 general election, when he became MP for the new Cities of London and Westminster constituency.

References

 
 British Parliamentary Election Results 1918-1949, compiled and edited by F.W.S. Craig (The Macmillan Press 1979)

1939 elections in the United Kingdom
By-elections to the Parliament of the United Kingdom in London constituencies
Elections in the City of Westminster
1939 in London
1930s in the City of Westminster